The North Carolina United States Senate election of 1984 was held on November 6, 1984 as part of the nationwide elections to the Senate, and coinciding with the 1984 presidential election.  The election was a showdown between the Republican incumbent Jesse Helms and then-incumbent Democratic Governor Jim Hunt. This election was one of the most dramatic in 1984. In the end, Helms won the election, the most expensive non-presidential election in United States history up to that point, by a margin significantly reduced from the margin that Helms achieved in 1978.

Primaries

Republican primary

Democratic primary

Hunt easily defeated businessman Thomas Allred, a supporter of Lyndon Larouche, to win the Democratic nomination.

General election

Campaign
Hunt had a commanding lead in opinion polls for much of the campaign, with one poll in 1983 putting him nineteen points clear of Helms.  However, that was changed by the most bitterly contested election in the country that year. Hunt ran a campaign ad connecting Helms to death squads in El Salvador through his association with the Nationalist Republican Alliance, for whom Roberto d'Aubuisson had recently run for the President of El Salvador.  In the short time before election day, however, the highly popular incumbent US President Ronald Reagan gave Helms a significant boost by campaigning for him and running a local TV ad praising Helms and asking registered voters in North Carolina to re-elect him.

The election cost a total of $26,379,483 in total reported spending (over twelve times as much as the 1980 race), of which, 64% ($16.9m) was spent by Helms.

This election is remembered as "one of North Carolina's most infamous political battles" and "as a prototype of the no-holds-barred brawls that typify a strand of modern-day partisan politics, polarizing voters along distinct ideological lines."

Results

A study by Voters Education Project in Atlanta showed that Helms received 63 percent of the white vote and was particularly successful in small towns and rural areas, while receiving less than 1 percent of the black vote in 35 almost-all-black precincts. Hunt got 37 percent of the white and 98.8 percent of the black vote, according to VEP. But only 61 percent of registered blacks voted, down from 63 percent in 1980."

See also 
  United States Senate elections, 1984

References

External links 
Debates
 North Carolina Senate General Election Debate on C-SPAN, July 29, 1984
 North Carolina Senate General Election Debate on C-SPAN, September 9, 1984
 North Carolina Senate General Election Debate on C-SPAN, October 13, 1984

1984
North Carolina
Jesse Helms
1984 North Carolina elections